Wilhelm Michael Anton Creizenach (4 June 1851 – 13 May 1919) was a German historian and librarian.

He was the son of Theodore (1818–1877), poet, Hebraist, a prominent expert on work of Goethe, and Luise Flerscheim.

He was educated at the gymnasium in Frankfurt, then studied history and Germanic Philology at the University of Göttingen (1870–1872), neofilologię at the University of Leipzig (1872–1874), Indo-European comparative syntax and Sanskrit at the University of Jena (1875–1876). In 1873 he received his doctorate in Leipzig (for work on Judas Iscariot in Sage und Legende des Mittelalters). During his studies at Jena while working in the university library in the 
years 1876–1878 was an assistant in the library of the University of Wroclaw. In 1879 after the presentation of work titled zur Entstehungsgeschichte des deutschen neueren Lustspiels, was an assistant professor in the Department of General History of Literature at the University of Leipzig, he taught modern literature, for a time worked as an assistant at the National Library in Paris.
In 1883 became professor of the Jagiellonian University, he headed the Department Germanistyki, he was director of Germanistycznego Seminary, from 1886 professor in the academic year 1901/1902 Dean of the Faculty of Philosophy. He created the strongest center in Poland on New Philology. Contributed to the creation of the Department of Romance Philology at the Jagiellonian University (1890) and founded the seminary library Germanistycznego. He lectured in the history of German literature from the Middle Ages to the Romantic, the history of the German language and art of Shakespeare. He was a member of the Examination Committee for candidates for secondary school teachers. He finished his career in Kraków in 1913, died in Dresden in poverty and solitude.

External links
 

1851 births
1919 deaths
German librarians
German literary historians
German male non-fiction writers